The Hwasong-14, also known under alternative US designation codename KN-20, is a mobile intercontinental ballistic missile developed by North Korea. It had its maiden flight on 4 July 2017, which coincided with the United States' Independence Day. North Korea is the only known operator of this missile.

Design
The Hwasong-14 is likely a two-staged version of the Hwasong-12 first tested in May 2017. The second stage appears to have increased its range. The first stage engine appears very similar to the Hwasong-12. With a single liquid fuel engine, it has four Vernier thrusters for stability and guidance.

A detailed analysis by the Bulletin of the Atomic Scientists claims that the current variant of the Hwasong-14 may not even be capable of delivering a first-generation nuclear warhead to Anchorage, Alaska. But even if North Korea is now capable of fabricating a relatively light-weight, "miniaturized" atomic bomb that can survive the extreme reentry environments of long-range rocket delivery, it will, with certainty, not be able to deliver such an atomic bomb to the lower 48 states of the United States with the rocket tested on July 3 and July 28.

A first-generation North Korean nuclear missile warhead is estimated to weigh .

The missile is launched from a detachable platform on a concrete pad. This could have several operational ramifications. It may increase the time required to launch the Hwasong-12, and limit the number of launch locations to pre-sited and pre-constructed launch pads.

Engine 
Michael Elleman of IISS and the Bulletin of the Atomic Scientists both claim that available evidence clearly indicates that the engine is based on the Soviet RD-250 family of engines for the R-36 missile, and has been modified to operate as the boosting force for the Hwasong-12 and -14. According to his theory an unknown number of these engines were probably acquired through illicit channels operating in Russia and/or Ukraine. North Korea’s need for an alternative to the failing Musudan and the recent appearance of the RD-250 engine along with other evidence, suggests the transfers occurred in 2015-2017. Ukraine rejected this theory claiming it was "most likely provoked by Russian secret services to cover their own crimes." Other US experts have questioned whether the evidence for Elleman's theory is strong enough to back up his claims. Engine maker Yuzhnoye Design Office denied that the engines were supplied to North Korea by Ukraine.

In August 2017 the State Space Agency of Ukraine claimed that the rocket engine used during 28 July 2017 North Korea's missile test was RD-250  made at a Ukrainian factory, but solely for use in Tsyklon space rockets supplied to Russia. The space agency chief said that according to Ukrainian information, “Russia today has between 7 and 20” of the Tsyklon rockets...They have these engines, they have the documentation. They can supply these engines from the finished rockets to whoever they want.” The agency also claimed that a total of 223 Tsyklon-2 and Tsyklon-3 rockets were supplied to Russia. Furthermore, he stated that North Korea cannot produce the fuel for the RD-250 (N2O4 and UDMH), and that it must have been produced either in China or in Ukraine.

According to South Korean intelligence, North Korea received 20 to 40 RD-251 engines from Russia in 2016.

Arms expert Jeffrey Lewis claimed that "The second stage of North Korea's Hwasong-14 missile is similar to the upper stages designed for the Iranian space launch vehicles".

List of Hwasong-14 tests

First test flight 

The first publicly announced flight test was on 4 July 2017, to coincide with the US Independence Day celebrations. This flight had a claimed range of  eastwards into the Sea of Japan (East Sea of Korea) and reached an altitude of  during a 39-minute flight.

This range was deliberately shortened, to avoid encroaching on other nations' territory, by 'lofting' the missile: firing it on a trajectory that was inefficiently high, rather than optimised for range. This allows the missile's performance to be tested and demonstrated, without requiring a huge test range.

If true, then this brings the U.S. states of Alaska and Hawaii within the missile's range.

Second test flight 
Preparations for a second test flight were detected by US intelligence as early as 20 July. On 28 July, the missile was fired at 11:41 p.m local time, the first time which a night time launch was carried out.
Based on the data from the test flight, if the missile were fired at the optimal efficient trajectory, it is predicted that the maximum effective range would exceed .  If factoring in the rotation of the Earth, which may provide a range boost when travelling eastward, the Hwasong-14’s coverage area would include the US West Coast, Chicago, and possibly even New York, but only with a substantially reduced payload.

Gallery

See also 
Pukkuksong-1
Hwasong-10
Hwasong-12
KN-08 / Hwasong-13
Hwasong-15

References

Intercontinental ballistic missiles of North Korea
Military equipment introduced in the 2010s